The 2022 Copa do Brasil final rounds were the final rounds (round of 16, quarter-finals, semi-finals and finals) of the 2022 Copa do Brasil football competition. They were played from 22 June to 19 October 2022. A total of 16 teams competed in the final rounds to decide the champions of the 2022 Copa do Brasil.

Format
In the final rounds, each tie was played on a home-and-away two-legged basis. If the aggregate score was level, the second-leg match would go straight to the penalty shoot-out to determine the winners.

Bracket

Round of 16

Draw
The draw for the round of 16 was be held on 7 June 2022, 15:00 at CBF headquarters in Rio de Janeiro. The 16 qualified teams were drawn in a single group (CBF ranking shown in parentheses).

Matches

The first legs were played on 22–30 June and the second legs were played on 12–14 July 2022.

|}
All times are Brasília time, BRT (UTC−3)

Match 77

Corinthians won 4–1 on aggregate and advanced to the quarter-finals.

Match 78

Tied 2–2 on aggregate, São Paulo won on penalties and advanced to the quarter-finals.

Match 79

Athletico Paranaense won 4–2 on aggregate and advanced to the quarter-finals.

Match 80

Atlético Goianiense won 3–0 on aggregate and advanced to the quarter-finals.

Match 81

Fortaleza won 2–1 on aggregate and advanced to the quarter-finals.

Match 82

Fluminense won 5–1 on aggregate and advanced to the quarter-finals.

Match 83

América Mineiro won 5–0 on aggregate and advanced to the quarter-finals.

Match 84

Flamengo won 3–2 on aggregate and advanced to the quarter-finals.

Quarter-finals

Draw
The draw for the quarter-finals was held on 19 July 2022, 13:30 at CBF headquarters in Rio de Janeiro. All teams were placed into a single group (CBF ranking shown in parentheses).

Matches

The first legs were played on 27–28 July and the second legs were played on 17–18 August 2022.

|}
All times are Brasília time, BRT (UTC−3)

Match 85

Corinthians won 4–3 on aggregate and advanced to the semi-finals.

Match 86

Fluminense won 3–2 on aggregate and advanced to the semi-finals.

Match 87

São Paulo won 3–2 on aggregate and advanced to the semi-finals.

Match 88

Flamengo won 1–0 on aggregate and advanced to the semi-finals.

Semi-finals

Draw
The draw to determine the home-and-away teams for both legs was held on 19 August 2022, 11:00 at CBF headquarters in Rio de Janeiro.

Matches

The first legs were played on 24 August and the second legs were played on 14–15 September 2022.

|}
All times are Brasília time, BRT (UTC−3)

Match 89

Corinthians won 5–2 on aggregate and advanced to the finals.

Match 90

Flamengo won 4–1 on aggregate and advanced to the finals.

Finals

Draw
The draw to determine the home-and-away teams for both legs was held on 20 September 2022, 11:00 at CBF headquarters in Rio de Janeiro.

Matches
The first leg was played on 12 October and the second leg was played on 19 October 2022.

|}

All times are Brasília time, BRT (UTC−3)

Match 91

References

2022 in Brazilian football